Dean Schlabowske (aka Deano, or Deano Waco, or Ramblin' Deano) is an American guitarist, singer, and songwriter. He has been a member of several bands including Wreck, The Waco Brothers, Dollar Store, Deano and the Purvs, in addition to his solo work and various other collaborations.

Early life 
Schlabowske grew up in Milwaukee, Wisconsin, but has spent much of his adult life living in Chicago, Illinois. From 2007-2012, he owned and operated the Cellar Rat wine shop in Wicker Park.

Career 
In 2014, Schlabowske moved to Austin, Texas. There, he continued his collaboration with former members of The Meat Purveyors, and started a band called TV White. "Due to an illness in the family and the desire to buy an affordable home," Schlabowske returned to Milwaukee in 2017.

Solo Discography

Albums 
 2004: Dollar Store (Bloodshot Records) - as Dollar Store
 2004: Money Music (Bloodshot Records) - as Dollar Store
 2017: America's Favorite Folk Singer (Pigsville Music, BMI)
 2018: Soundtrack To The Next IPO (Pigsville Music, BMI)
 2019: Ramblin' Deano And Ice Cold Singles (Pigsville Music, BMI) - as Ramblin' Deano and Ice Cold Singles
 2020: Pills, Puppies And Bacon (Pigsville Music, BMI) - as Ramblin' Deano And His Enablers
 2020: Bad Luck Days (Pigsville Music, BMI) - as Ramblin' Deano And The Purvs

Singles 
 Frozen Lake/Slipstream (Pigsville Music, BMI) - as TV White
 2020: We Move On (Pigsville Music, BMI)

See also 
 Wreck
 The Waco Brothers
 Pine Valley Cosmonauts

References

Living people
Year of birth missing (living people)
American rock guitarists
American country guitarists
American male guitarists
American rock singers
Bloodshot Records artists